Chewton Glen is a five star hotel and spa located on the edge of the New Forest National Park on the south coast of England. It is a member of the Relais & Châteaux association and is part of the Iconic Luxury Hotels group, which includes Cliveden House, 11 Cadogan Gardens and The Lygon Arms.

History
Historic document suggest that the house was originally built in the eighteenth century, with the first recorded mention of 'Chewton Glen House' appearing in 1732.

Captain Frederick Marryat stayed here for periods in the 1840s, during which time he was writing the novel The Children of the New Forest. Marryat's brother, George, owned the property from 1837 until 1855.

In 1947 the house was bought, with the nearby farm, stables and 120 hectares of land, by the Duval (or Devall) family, who restored the old buildings. They converted the property into a hotel in 1962. The hotel was sold to Martin Skan and his brother Trevor in 1966. At that time only two rooms had their own bathroom, but within a few years they modernised the hotel with new kitchens, a lounge, a dining room and 45 hotel rooms, each with a private bath. Within ten years the hotel had an international reputation, and the Skans remained proprietors for 40 years.

In 2006, Chewton Glen was bought by the property magnate Ian Livingstone. It has since become one of many hotels owned by London & Regional Properties, a property company which Livingstone founded with his brother, Richard Livingstone in 1987.

In 2010 the hotel hosted a charity drive by Chris Evans which raised money for local and national charities, including Children in Need.

Location
Chewton Glen Hotel is situated in New Milton in Hampshire on the south coast of England. The name "Chewton Glen" refers to a tree-lined ravine, otherwise known as Chewton Bunny, a short distance to the south of the hotel.

References

Hotel spas
Hotels in Hampshire